Nikola Sibiak (born 21 June 2000) is a Polish track cyclist. She competed at the 2018 UCI Junior Track Cycling World Championships, winning two bronze medals and a silver medal in the sprint, team sprint and keirin events. Sibiak also competed at the 2020 UEC European Track Championships, winning a bronze and silver medal in the team sprint and keirin events. She competed at the 2021 UCI Track Cycling World Championships.

References

External links 
Cycling Archives profile

2000 births
Living people
People from Darłowo
Polish female cyclists
Polish track cyclists
21st-century Polish women